Pahlawan may refer to:

People
Abdul Malik Pahlawan (fl. 1990s), an Uzbek warlord and politician
Gocah Pahlawan (died c. 1641), founder of the Sultanate of Deli and the Sultanate of Serdang in North Sumatra, Indonesia
Gul Mohammad Pahalwan (fl. 1990s), an Uzbek military leader
Muhammad Jahan Pahlavan, ruler of the Eldiguzids 1175–1186
Rasul Pahlawan (died 1996), an Uzbek military leader
Amir Kror Suri or Jahan Pahlawan (died 771 CE), a legendary Pashtun leader
Pahlawan Mohanadas (fl. 1981–2004), head of Malaysian Armed Forces Health Services

See also

Palawan (disambiguation)
Parthia, a historical region located in north-eastern Iran
Pehlwani, a form of wrestling